Plumpton is a place in Northamptonshire, England, in the civil parish of Weston and Weedon. It is within the ecclesiastical parish of "St Mary & St Peter Lois Weedon with Weston and Plumpton".

The name 'Plumpton' means 'Plum-tree farm/settlement'.

The church of St John is grade II listed and is now cared for by a charity, the St. John the Baptist, Plumpton, Heritage Trust. The Manor House is grade II* listed; some of its associated gates and walls are separately grade II listed.

The 1870-72 Imperial Gazetteer of England and Wales describes Plumpton as having a population of 42 in 12 houses, and describes the church as "good" and having a "pinnacled tower". 
Plumpton was a civil parish until 1935.

References

External links

Paulerspury parish website

Villages in Northamptonshire
Former civil parishes in Northamptonshire
West Northamptonshire District